Ely Jacques Kahn Jr. (December 4, 1916 – May 28, 1994) was an American writer with The New Yorker for five decades.

Biography
Born in New York City, he was the son of architect Ely Jacques Kahn, and the brother of mystery editor and anthologist Joan Kahn.  He attended the Horace Mann School and Harvard University, where he took his B.A. in 1937. He was hired by St. Clair McKelway at The New Yorker in 1937 and his first byline appeared there in the April 3, 1937 issue.  Before World War II, he was drafted and served in the U.S. Army from 1941 to 1945. The New Yorker publishing 39 of his pieces on Army life that were later collected in book form.

His long career with the magazine resulted in numerous books on such varied subjects as Coca-Cola, Lesley J. McNair, the Trust Territory of the Pacific Islands, Harvard University, Herbert Bayard Swope, Frank Sinatra, Dwayne O. Andreas of Archer Daniels Midland, and the Postal Inspection Service. However, his multi-part series on grain, which was published in book form as "Staffs of Life" in 1985, was criticized by some as an example of the self-indulgent journalism that marked The New Yorker during the 1970s and '80s.

Kahn lived in Scarborough-on-Hudson, New York, for more than 20 years, and was a member of the Briarcliff Manor Fire Department. He taught writing at Columbia University from 1974 to 1977.

His book The New Yorker and Me (New York:  G.P. Putnam's, 1979) is a diary interspersed with memories of his life, the magazine, and its editor William Shawn—whom Kahn calls "The Iron Mouse." His 1987 diary was released as Year of Change: More about the New Yorker and Me (New York: Viking, 1988).

Death
Kahn died in a traffic accident on May 28, 1994, in Holyoke, Massachusetts, at the age of 77.

Bibliography

Books
 Army Life, 1942
 G. I. Jungle, 1943
 McNair: Educator of an Army, 1945
 Fighting Divisions, 1945
 The Voice, 1947(Sinatra)
 Who, Me?, 1949
 The Peculiar War, 1952
 The Merry Partners: The Age and Stage of Harrigan and Hart, 1955
 The Big Drink: The Story of Coca-Cola, 1960
 The A Reporter Here and There, 1961
 The Stragglers, 1962
 The World of Swope, 1964
 A Reporter in Micronesia, 1966
 The Separated People: A Look at Contemporary South Africa, 1968
 Harvard: Through Change and Through Storm, 1969
 The Boston Underground Gourmet, 1972
 The First Decade: A Report on Independent Black Africa, 1972
 Fraud: The United States Postal Inspection Service and Some of the Fools and Knaves It Has Known, 1973
 The American People, 1973
 The China Hands: America's Foreign Service Officers and What Befell Them, 1975
 Georgia from Rabun Gap to Tybee Light, 1978
 Far-Flung and Footloose, 1979
 The New Yorker and Me, 1979
 Jock: The Life and Times of John Hay Whitney, 1981
 The Staffs of Life, 1985
 The Problem Solvers: A History of Arthur D. Little, Inc., 1986
 Year of Change: More about the New Yorker and Me, 1988.
 Supermarketer to the World: The Story of Dwayne Andreas, 1991.

Essays and reporting
 
 
 
 
———————
Notes

References

External links
  New Yorker Obituary by Bruce Bliven, June 13, 1994 issue

1916 births
1994 deaths
American male journalists
Journalists from New York City
Horace Mann School alumni
Harvard University alumni
Columbia University faculty
The New Yorker people
The New Yorker staff writers
United States Army soldiers
United States Army personnel of World War II
People from Briarcliff Manor, New York
20th-century American non-fiction writers
20th-century American male writers